Jacques Fullard (born 19 September 1974) is a South African former professional racing cyclist. He won the South African National Road Race Championships in 2001 and 2006.

Major results
1997
 3rd Road race, National Road Championships
1998
 2nd Road race, National Road Championships
1999
 1st Stage 6 Giro del Capo
 3rd  Road race, African Road Championships
 3rd Road race, National Road Championships
2001
 1st  Road race, African Road Championships
 1st  Road race, National Road Championships
2004
 1st Pick n Pay Amashovashova National Classic
2005
 1st Powerade Dome 2 Dome Cycling Spectacular
2006
 1st  Road race, National Road Championships

References

External links
 

1974 births
Living people
South African male cyclists
People from Polokwane
White South African people
Sportspeople from Limpopo